The Saransk Cup was a tournament for professional female tennis players played on outdoor clay courts. The event was classified as a $50,000 ITF Women's Circuit tournament. It was held in Saransk, Russia, in 2011.

Past finals

Women's singles

Women's doubles

External links 
 ITF search

 
ITF Women's World Tennis Tour
Clay court tennis tournaments
Tennis tournaments in Russia